Juan Boza Sánchez or Juan Stopper Sanchez (1941 in Camagüey, Cuba – 1991 in New York City, New York) was a gay Afro-Cuban-American artist specializing at painting, drawing, engraving, installation and graphic design.

Boza Sánchez studied at the Escuela Nacional de Bellas Artes "San Alejandro" from 1960 to 1962 and then from 1962 to 1964 at the Escuela Nacional de Arte (ENA) both located in Havana, Cuba. He was expelled from San Alejandro due to "political issues" and became a lithographer with the Experimental Graphic Workshop in 1965.

Boza Sánchez was fired as a result of the Congress of Education and Culture which convened in 1971 and led to the censorship of many artists in Cuba. In the years between 1971 and his exodus from Cuba in 1980 Boza restored religious statues to earn a living.

He died in 1991 in New York City.

Collections
His work is in a number of collections: the British Broadcasting Corporation (BBC) in London, UK; the Casa de las Américas in Havana, Cuba; the Tapes Inc. Foundation in New York City ; the Museum of the Independent University of Mexico in Mexico City; and the 'Museo Nacional de Bellas Artes in Havana.

References

  Jose Veigas-Zamora, Cristina Vives Gutierrez, Adolfo V. Nodal, Valia Garzon, Dannys Montes de Oca; Memoria: Cuban Art of the 20th Century; (California/International Arts Foundation 2001); 
 Jose Viegas; Memoria: Artes Visuales Cubanas Del Siglo Xx; (California International Arts 2004);   
 The Miami Herald, JUAN BOZA CUBAN PAINTER, March 7, 1991
 Randy P. Conner & David Hatfield Sparks, Queering Creole Spiritual Traditions: Lesbian, Gay, Bisexual, and Transgendered Participation in African Inspired Traditions in the Americas; (Haworth Press, Binghamton, New York, 2004); 
 Ed. Fuentes-Perez, Ileana et al. Outside Cuba: Contemporary Cuban Visual Artists; 1989. 
 Miller, Ivor. 1995. "Belief and Power in Contemporary Cuba: The Dialogue Between Santería Practitioners and Revolutionary Leaders.” Ph.D. dissertation. Northwestern University. (chapter four)
 Miller, Ivor. 2009. "Voice of the Leopard: African Secret Societies and Cuba." UP of Mississippi. (Introduction)

External links
 Cintas Foundation webpage on artist
  Juan Boza – installations
  The Art of Religion: A Tribute to Juan Boza
  A Rereading of Juan Boza'a Critique of Wifredo Lam: The Emergence of Afro-Cuban Arts in Post-Revolutionary Cuba
 THE JUDITH ROTHSCHILD FOUNDATION GRANT RECIPIENTS FOR 2003

Cuban contemporary artists
Cuban painters
Cuban gay artists
Cuban LGBT painters
Gay painters
Modern painters
People from Camagüey
1941 births
1991 deaths
20th-century Cuban LGBT people